Hezbollah Al-Hejaz (literally Party of God in the Hejaz), or Hizbollah in the Hijaz, was a militant Shia organization operating in Saudi Arabia. It was founded in May 1987 in Saudi Arabia's Eastern Province. 
It is pro-Khomeini as opposed to the pro-Shirazi Organization for the Islamic Revolution in the Arabian Peninsula. 
In the years 1987-89 the party launched attacks against official Saudi targets inside and outside Saudi Arabia. After being implicated in the Khobar Towers Bombing in 1996, the party was outlawed in Saudi Arabia. Most of its members were arrested and the party practically ceased to exist. In 2014 it was designated a terrorist organization by the kingdom's government.

Early Activities 
The first years after the Shiite Islamic Revolution the relations between Iran and Saudi Arabia were tense and even hostile. A major source of conflict was the Saudi authorities’ treatment of the Shia minority in the Kingdoms Eastern Province. Another important factor was the Saudi support for Iraq in the Iran–Iraq War.

Relations between the two countries improved in the mid-1980s, but suddenly took a negative turn in 1987  after a violent episode during the Mecca pilgrimage of that year. Demonstrations of Iranian pilgrims were violently suppressed, which led to a stampede that killed over 400, mainly Iranian, pilgrims.

The Hizbullah of the Hijaz was founded in May 1987 with active encouragement from Iran. Hijaz is generally used as the name of the western part of Saudi Arabia. Here it was denoting the whole country, as using the name Saudi Arabia would imply recognition of the Al Saud ruling dynasty.

The organization carried out several attacks in Saudi Arabia in the second half of the 1980s. In August 1987, an explosion occurred at a petroleum facility in Ra's al-Ju'ayma and in March the following year a petrochemical industry in Jubail was attacked. Ra's Tanura refinery was also attacked. Several Saudi policemen were killed and wounded in clashes with Hizbullah fighters. The Saudi authorities answered with wide-spread arrests among suspected Shia activists.
The organization was also strongly suspected of being responsible for a number of attacks against Saudi targets abroad, such as diplomats etc. These attacks were never officially claimed by Hezbollah al-Hejaz.

After the end of the Iran-Iraq war in 1988, relations again thawed between the two countries.
In 1993, King Fahd, responding positively to more moderate parts of the Shia opposition and met several of its representatives. Desiring to end Shiite opposition to the government, Fahd promised to work towards improving conditions for Shiites in Saudi Arabia. This took the form of, amongst other things, ordering the elimination of derogatory terms for Shiites from textbooks, removing certain other forms of explicit discrimination, and of allowing many Saudi Shiite exiles to return to Saudi Arabia.

Although formally not a partner to the agreement and even voicing disagreements with it, Hizbullah al-Hejaz members were included in the amnesty and the organization generally abided by its terms. The organization’s members mainly refrained from overt opposition politics and concentrated on religious, social and educational activities.

Khobar Towers bombing
In June 1996, a massive truck bomb exploded outside the US Air Force base at Khobar in eastern Saudi Arabia, killing 19 American soldiers and wounding several hundred. Subsequent American and Saudi investigations blamed Hizbullah al-Hijaz for the attack. Hezbollah al-Hejaz had never executed any violent attacks against American targets or against any Saudi targets since 1989. Al-Qaeda on the other hand had executed a relentless campaign of attacks against American targets both before and after the Khobar bombing, in Saudi Arabia and elsewhere.

Osama bin-Laden and al-Qaeda eventually claimed responsibility for the Khobar attack.

After the East Africa embassy bombings in 1998 and especially the September 11 attacks in 2001, several observers expressed doubts about the true culprits of the Khobar bombings.

Former US Secretary of Defence William Perry declared in 2007 that he now believed that al-Qaeda was responsible for the Khobar attack. Back in the day, US had not taken al-Qaeda seriously.

Others have said that on balance, the available evidence suggests Shiite responsibility.
After the Khobar bombing most of the members and people associated with the Hezbollah al-Hejaz were arrested by Saudi authorities. The organization practically ceased to exist.

Many of the members of the organization has since been released. Several others, including those indicted by US authorities, still remain in jail in Saudi Arabia without trial.

The alleged head of the military wing of Hezbollah al-Hejaz, Ahmed Ibrahim Al-Mughassil, who was suspected of involvement in the Khobar bombing, was reportedly captured in Beirut in August 2015 and transferred to Saudi Arabia.

Designation as a terrorist organization

See also
 Hezbollah (Lebanon)
 Kata'ib Hezbollah (Iraq)
 Harakah Hezbollah al-Nujaba (Iraq)
 Liwa Assad Allah (Iraq & Syria)
 Jaysh al-Mu'ammal (Iraq & Syria)
 Harakah al-Sabireen (Palestine)
 Jaysh al-Mahdi (Iraq)
 Islamic Movement (Nigeria)
 Ansar-e Hezbollah (Iran)
 Hezbollah Movement in Iran
 Hezbollah Movement in Iraq
 Sadrist Movement

References

External links
Terrorism charges have been brought against 13 members of the pro-Iran Saudi Hizballah at FBI
Saudi Hezbollah GlobalSecurity

1987 establishments in Saudi Arabia
Banned Islamist parties
Independence movements
Islamism in Bahrain
Islamism in Kuwait
Islamism in Saudi Arabia
Islamist insurgent groups
Khomeinist groups
Organizations designated as terrorist by Saudi Arabia
Organizations designated as terrorist by the United Arab Emirates
Organizations based in Asia designated as terrorist
Political parties established in 1987
Paramilitary organizations based in Kuwait
Paramilitary organisations based in Saudi Arabia
Political parties in Saudi Arabia
Rebel groups in Saudi Arabia
Republicanism in Saudi Arabia
Saudi Arabian opposition groups
Shia Islamic political parties
Terrorism in Saudi Arabia